The following is a partial list of current and former notable faculty of Fordham University in New York City.

Faculty

 Joseph Abboud
 Abraham Abramovsky
 JoAnne Akalaitis
 Meena Alexander
 Dale Allender
 Anne Anastasi
 Bruce Andrews
 Robert Araujo
 Amy Aronson
 Babette Babich
 William F. Baker (television)
 Bonnie Ballif-Spanvill
 Marleen S. Barr
 Deborah Batts
 Charles Beirne
 Hilaire Belloc
 Tina Benko
 Thomas V. Bermingham
 Daniel Berrigan
 Eugene Biel-Bienne
 Lawrence Boadt
 Louis F. Budenz
 David Budescu
 Gráinne de Búrca
 Deborah Burton
 Joseph Campbell (poet)
 Richard S. Carnell
 John A. Carpenter
 Elaine Congress
 Cardinal Terence Cooke
 Vincent Cooke, S.J.
 Saul Cornell
 Cusi Cram
 Cynthia Cruz
 John M. Culkin
 Marcus Daly (politics)
 Brian Davies (philosopher)
 Richard Digby Day
 Joanne Dobson
Alphonsus J. Donlon
 Cardinal Avery Dulles
 Mario Einaudi
 John Feerick
 Celia B. Fisher
 Joseph Fitzmyer
 Alison Fraser
 Sarah Gambito
 Michael J. Garanzini
 Richard Goldstone
 James Goodale
 Jennifer Gordon
 Robert E. Gould
 John Greco (philosopher)
 Karen J. Greenberg
 Benedict Groeschel, C.F.R.
 Ernest van den Haag
 Oskar Halecki
 George Haley
 Garth Risk Hallberg
 Abigail M. Harris
 Stephen McKinley Henderson
 Karl Herzfeld
 Elizabeth Hess
 Victor Francis Hess
 Dietrich von Hildebrand
 Ross J. S. Hoffman
 Olivia Hooker
 Jean Houston
 Deal W. Hudson
 Mehrdad Izady
 Eloisa James
 Morgan Jenness
 Elizabeth Johnson (theologian)
 Daniel Alexander Jones
 Vytautas Kazimieras Jonynas
 Carl Jung
 Ani Kalayjian 
 Merle Keitel
 Barbara Kellerman (academic)
 Joseph Koterski
 Lawrence Kramer (musicologist)
 Erik von Kuehnelt-Leddihn
 Vladimir Kvint
 Brian Leftow
 Paul Levinson
 C. Eric Lincoln
 Rick Lombardo
 Mark S. Massa
 Bryan Joseph McEntegart
 Francis Patrick McFarland
 Christopher C. McGrath
 Marshall McLuhan
 John J. McNeill
 Margaret Mead
 Thomas Patrick Melady
 John Meyendorff
 Pietro Montana
 John Muller
 Mark Naison
 Diana Villiers Negroponte
 Robert Cummings Neville
 Cardinal Patrick O'Boyle
 Vincent O'Keefe, S.J.
 William O'Malley (Jesuit), S.J.
 Terry A. Osborn
 Guillermo Owen
 Harley Parker
 Joseph G. Ponterotto
 Phylicia Rashad
 Donna Redel
 Cornelius L. Reid
 William L. Reilly
 Charles E. Rice
 Susan Scafidi
 Seungpil Yu
 John P. Shanley
 Dinesh Sharma
 Clare Shore
 Asif Azam Siddiqi
 George Bundy Smith
 John E. Sprizzo
 Herbert G. Squiers
 John Stallo
 Werner Stark
 Peter Steinfels
 E. Mark Stern
 James A.F. Stoner
 Harold Takooshian
 Charles C. Tansill (1890–1964), Professor of History at Fordham University from 1939 to 1944.
 Zephyr Teachout
 Nicholas Timasheff
 Bradley Tusk
 Judith Vladeck
 Jeffrey P. von Arx
 Milan Zeleny

Former presidents

Cardinal John McCloskey 1841–43
Rev. Ambrose Manahan 1843
Rev. John B. Harley 1844–1845
Most Rev. James Roosevelt Bayley 1845–46
Rev. Augustus Thébaud, S.J. 1846–51 and 1859–63
Rev. John Larkin, S.J. 1851–54
 Rev. Rémi-Joseph Tellier, S.J. 1854–59
 Rev. Edward Doucet, S.J. 1863–65
 Rev. William Moylan, S.J. 1865–68
 Rev. Joseph Shea S.J. 1868–74
 Rev. William Gockeln, S.J. 1874–82
 Rev. Patrick F. Dealy, S.J. 1882–85
 Rev. Thomas F. Campbell, S.J. 1885–88 and 1896–1900
 Rev. John Scully, S.J. 1888–91
 Rev. Thomas Gannon, S.J. 1891–96
 Rev. George A. Pettit, S.J. 1900–04
 Most Rev. John J. Collins, S.J. 1904–06
 Rev. Daniel J. Quinn, S.J. 1906–11
 Rev. Thomas J. McCluskey, S.J. 1911–15
 Rev. Joseph A. Mulry, S.J. 1915–19
 Rev. Edward P. Tivnan, S.J. 1919–24
 Rev. William J. Duane, S.J. 1924–30
 Rev. Aloysius J. Hogan, S.J. 1930–36
 Rev. Robert I. Gannon, S.J. 1936–49
 Rev. Laurence J. McGinley, S.J. 1949–63
 Rev. Vincent T. O'Keefe, S.J. 1963–65
 Rev. Leo J. McLaughlin, S.J. 1965–69
 Rev. Michael P. Walsh, S.J. 1969–72
 Rev. James C. Finlay, S.J. 1972–84
 Rev. Joseph A. O'Hare, S.J. 1984–2003
 Rev. Joseph M. McShane, S.J. 2003–present

Commencement Speakers 1941–present

See also
:Category:Fordham University faculty

References

External links

Faculty
 
Fordham University